"Closer to the Heart" is a song by Canadian rock band Rush. It was released in November 1977 as the lead single from their fifth studio album A Farewell to Kings. It was the first Rush song to feature a non-member as a songwriter in Peter Talbot, a friend of drummer and lyricist Neil Peart. It was Rush's first hit single in the United Kingdom, reaching number 36 in the UK Singles Chart in February 1978. It also peaked at number 45 in Canada and number 76 on the US Billboard Hot 100. It was inducted into the Canadian Songwriters Hall of Fame on March 28, 2010.

Cash Box called it a "strong song" and said that it is "very like a Led Zeppelin number in terms of structure, timbres, and the role of the lead vocalist."  Record World called it a "stately rocker with a strong vocal."

A live version of the song was released as a single in 1981 as the lead single from their live album, Exit...Stage Left which peaked at number 69 on the US Billboard Hot 100.

Background
The band's frontman, Geddy Lee, said of the song:I remember when we had to bring it back into the set for the Rio shows, as there was such a demand to hear it and we’d stopped playing it for a while. It's always resonated with people for some reason, and it was a hit as far as we've ever had a hit. It got us on the radio, the kinds of radio that would never normally associate with us, so it was as close as we ever came to a pop song, especially at that point. Over here in the UK it had that effect, and in the US too.

Performances
One of Rush's most popular songs, it has been performed live regularly since its release. It was not played for the bulk of the Vapor Trails Tour (2002), the R30 Tour (2004), and the Snakes & Arrows Tour (2007–08). The song returned to Rush's setlists during the 2010–11 Time Machine Tour. After not being performed on the 2012–13 Clockwork Angels Tour, it was brought back for the 2015 R40 Live Tour.

The live albums A Show of Hands and Different Stages feature performances of the song with jam-style playing after the last verse. On the 1981 live album Exit...Stage Left, the song segues into "Beneath, Between and Behind", and on Time Machine 2011: Live in Cleveland, it shifts into a triplet feel for the last verse. On the DVD release of the latter album, a polka rendition of the song is played during the end credits.

Although the original recording and most live performances feature acoustic drums, Peart used an electronic drum kit to play the song in concerts from 1984 to 1994.

In 2005, Rush performed the song with Mike Smith (in character as Bubbles from Trailer Park Boys) and Ed Robertson of Barenaked Ladies as part of a CBC telethon for the Canadian Tsunami Disaster Fund. This performance is included on the R30: 30th Anniversary World Tour DVD.

In 2022, Lee and Lifeson joined members of Primus and South Park co-creator Matt Stone to perform "Closer to the Heart" for the South Park 25th Anniversary Concert at Red Rocks Amphitheatre. It was Lee and Lifeson's first public performance together following Rush's disbandment and Peart's death.

Track listing UK version

A Side
"Closer to the Heart" – 2:53 (Lee/Lifeson/Peart/Talbot)

B side
"Bastille Day" – 4:37 (Lee/Lifeson/Peart)
"Anthem" – 4:10 (Lee/Lifeson/Peart) [only on 12"]
"The Temples of Syrinx" – 2:13 (Lee/Lifeson/Peart)

Charts

Weekly charts

See also
List of Rush songs

References

1977 singles
1981 singles
Rush (band) songs
Songs written by Alex Lifeson
Songs written by Geddy Lee
Songs written by Neil Peart
Song recordings produced by Terry Brown (record producer)
1977 songs
Mercury Records singles